July Fourteenth, Rue Daunou, 1910 is an early 20th century painting by American impressionist Childe Hassam. Done in oil on canvas, the painting depicts the celebration of Bastille Day in Paris.

Description
July Fourteenth, Rue Daunou, 1910 depicts the celebration of Bastille Day from the artist's viewpoint on top of the Hôtel l’Empire in Paris. The street below is thronged with automobiles and people, while the flags of France, Belgium, and the United States are being flown on various buildings. The Metropolitan Museum of Art, where the painting is now on display, considers the painting to be a precursor to Hassam's famous Flag Series.

It is on display in the Metropolitan Museums's Gallery 774.

References

1910 paintings
Impressionist paintings
Paintings in the collection of the Metropolitan Museum of Art
Flags in art
Paintings by Childe Hassam